The Siata 208 CS is an Italian sports car produced by Siata. Introduced in 1952, it is the coupé counterpart to the Siata 208S released that same year.

History 
Introduced in 1952 at that year's Turin Auto Show, the 208 series was the successor to Siata's first foray into fully bespoke automobiles, the Siata Daina. 18 cars are said to have been built, of which 11 were bodied by Balbo while the other 7 featured bodies by Stabilimenti Farina. A handful of the 11 cars bodied by Balbo were badged as "200 CS" while the rest were "208 CS". At least one of the Farina bodied cars built was a convertible/spyder model.

Performance 
The 208 CS is powered by a tuned version of the Fiat "Otto Vu" engine, a 1,996 cc OHV alloy 70-degree V8, as used in the Fiat 8V. Power goes to the rear wheels through a 5-speed manual transmission. The 208 CS uses Siata's own tubular chassis design with an aluminum body, giving it a curb weight of around  For the drive train, the CS uses four-wheel independent wishbone suspension with coil-springs and shock absorbers and four-wheel hydraulic alloy drum brakes.

References 

Cars introduced in 1952
Siata vehicles
Rear-wheel-drive vehicles